María Belén Perez Sanchez (born 5 January 1973 in Granada) is a cyclist from Spain.  She has a vision impairment.  She competed at the 1992 summer Paralympics and  1996 Summer Paralympics. She finished second in the Tandem Road Race. She finished third in the Tandem Individual Pursuit track race.

References 

Spanish female cyclists
Living people
1973 births
Paralympic silver medalists for Spain
Paralympic bronze medalists for Spain
Cyclists at the 1996 Summer Paralympics
Cyclists at the 2000 Summer Paralympics
Sportspeople from Granada
Medalists at the 1992 Summer Paralympics
Medalists at the 1996 Summer Paralympics
Paralympic medalists in cycling
Paralympic cyclists of Spain
Cyclists from Andalusia
20th-century Spanish women